Józef Grzesiak may refer to:

* Józef Grzesiak (resistance fighter)  (1900–1975), Polish Scoutmaster (harcmistrz)
 Józef Grzesiak (boxer) (1941–2020), Polish boxer